Haggs is a small village in the Falkirk council area of Scotland.

At the 2001 census the population of Haggs was reported as 383 residents.

Haggs lies along the A803 road between Banknock and Dennyloanhead and is next to the location where the A80 road formerly turned into the M80 motorway.

Haggs Parish Church is shared with Banknock and often hosts the local school during religious holidays like Easter and Christmas.

Notable people
 Danny Malloy - former professional boxer and footballer.

See also
List of places in Falkirk council area

References

External links

Vision of Britain - Haggs
Haggs Parish Church - History

Villages in Falkirk (council area)